The electromagnetic wave equation is a second-order partial differential equation that describes the propagation of electromagnetic waves through a medium or in a vacuum.  It is a three-dimensional form of the wave equation. The homogeneous form of the equation, written in terms of either the electric field  or the magnetic field , takes the form:

where

In a vacuum, a fundamental physical constant. The electromagnetic wave equation derives from Maxwell's equations. In most older literature,  is called the magnetic flux density or magnetic induction. The following equationspredicate that any electromagnetic wave must be a transverse wave, where the electric field  and the magnetic field  are both perpendicular to the direction of wave propagation.

The origin of the electromagnetic wave equation

In his 1865 paper titled A Dynamical Theory of the Electromagnetic Field, James Clerk Maxwell utilized the correction to Ampère's circuital law that he had made in part III of his 1861 paper On Physical Lines of Force. In Part VI of his 1864 paper titled Electromagnetic Theory of Light, Maxwell combined displacement current with some of the other equations of electromagnetism and he obtained a wave equation with a speed equal to the speed of light. He commented:

The agreement of the results seems to show that light and magnetism are affections of the same substance, and that light is an electromagnetic disturbance propagated through the field according to electromagnetic laws.

Maxwell's derivation of the electromagnetic wave equation has been replaced in modern physics education by a much less cumbersome method involving combining the corrected version of Ampère's circuital law with Faraday's law of induction.

To obtain the electromagnetic wave equation in a vacuum using the modern method, we begin with the modern 'Heaviside' form of Maxwell's equations. In a vacuum- and charge-free space, these equations are:

These are the general Maxwell's equations specialized to the case with charge and current both set to zero.
Taking the curl of the curl equations gives:

We can use the vector identity

where  is any vector function of space. And

where  is a dyadic which when operated on by the divergence operator  yields a vector. Since

then the first term on the right in the identity vanishes and we obtain the wave equations:

where

is the speed of light in free space.

Covariant form of the homogeneous wave equation

These relativistic equations can be written in contravariant form as

where the electromagnetic four-potential is

with the Lorenz gauge condition:

and where

is the d'Alembert operator.

Homogeneous wave equation in curved spacetime

The electromagnetic wave equation is modified in two ways, the derivative is replaced with the covariant derivative and a new term that depends on the curvature appears.

where  is the Ricci curvature tensor and the semicolon indicates covariant differentiation.

The generalization of the Lorenz gauge condition in curved spacetime is assumed:

Inhomogeneous electromagnetic wave equation

Localized time-varying charge and current densities can act as sources of electromagnetic waves in a vacuum. Maxwell's equations can be written in the form of a wave equation with sources. The addition of sources to the wave equations makes the partial differential equations inhomogeneous.

Solutions to the homogeneous electromagnetic wave equation 

The general solution to the electromagnetic wave equation is a linear superposition of waves of the form

Although the function  can be and often is a monochromatic sine wave, it does not have to be sinusoidal, or even periodic. In practice,  cannot have infinite periodicity because any real electromagnetic wave must always have a finite extent in time and space. As a result, and based on the theory of Fourier decomposition, a real wave must consist of the superposition of an infinite set of sinusoidal frequencies.

In addition, for a valid solution, the wave vector and the angular frequency are not independent; they must adhere to the dispersion relation:

The variable  can only be used in this equation when the electromagnetic wave is in a vacuum.

Monochromatic, sinusoidal steady-state
The simplest set of solutions to the wave equation result from assuming sinusoidal waveforms of a single frequency in separable form:

where
 is the imaginary unit,
 is the angular frequency in radians per second,
 is the' frequency in hertz, and
 is Euler's formula.

Plane wave solutions

Consider a plane defined by a unit normal vector

Then planar traveling wave solutions of the wave equations are

where  is the position vector (in meters).

These solutions represent planar waves traveling in the direction of the normal vector .

Because the divergence of the electric and magnetic fields are zero, there are no fields in the direction of propagation.

This solution is the linearly polarized solution of the wave equations. There are also circularly polarized solutions in which the fields rotate about the normal vector.

Spectral decomposition
Because of the linearity of Maxwell's equations in a vacuum, solutions can be decomposed into a superposition of sinusoids. This is the basis for the Fourier transform method for the solution of differential equations. The sinusoidal solution to the electromagnetic wave equation takes the form

where
 is time (in seconds),
 is the angular frequency (in radians per second),
 is the wave vector (in radians per meter), and
 is the phase angle (in radians).
The wave vector is related to the angular frequency by

The electromagnetic spectrum is a plot of the field magnitudes (or energies) as a function of wavelength.

Multipole expansion

A generic electromagnetic field with frequency  can be written as a sum of solutions to these two equations. The three-dimensional solutions of the Helmholtz Equation can be expressed as expansions in spherical harmonics with coefficients proportional to the spherical Bessel functions.

The resulting expressions for a generic electromagnetic field are:

The multipole fields are given by

are vector spherical harmonics normalized so that

The multipole expansion of the electromagnetic field finds application in a number of problems involving spherical symmetry, for example antennae radiation patterns, or nuclear gamma decay. In these applications, one is often interested in the power radiated in the far-field.

The angular distribution of the time-averaged radiated power is then given by

See also

Theory and experiment

 Maxwell's equations
 Wave equation
 Partial differential equation
 Computational electromagnetics
 Electromagnetic radiation
 Charge conservation
 Light
 Electromagnetic spectrum
 Optics

 Special relativity
 General relativity
 Inhomogeneous electromagnetic wave equation
 Photon polarization
 Larmor power formula
 Theoretical and experimental justification for the Schrödinger equation

Applications

 Rainbow
 Cosmic microwave background
 Laser
 Laser fusion
 Photography
 X-ray
 X-ray crystallography
 Radar

 Radio wave
 Optical computing
 Microwave
 Holography
 Microscope
 Telescope
 Gravitational lens
 Black-body radiation

Biographies

 André-Marie Ampère
 Albert Einstein
 Michael Faraday
 Heinrich Hertz
 Oliver Heaviside
 James Clerk Maxwell
 Hendrik Lorentz

Notes

 Further reading 

Electromagnetism

Journal articles
 Maxwell, James Clerk, "A Dynamical Theory of the Electromagnetic Field", Philosophical Transactions of the Royal Society of London 155, 459-512 (1865). (This article accompanied a December 8, 1864 presentation by Maxwell to the Royal Society.)

Undergraduate-level textbooks

 Edward M. Purcell, Electricity and Magnetism (McGraw-Hill, New York, 1985). .
 Hermann A. Haus and James R. Melcher, Electromagnetic Fields and Energy (Prentice-Hall, 1989) .
 Banesh Hoffmann, Relativity and Its Roots (Freeman, New York, 1983). .
 David H. Staelin, Ann W. Morgenthaler, and Jin Au Kong, Electromagnetic Waves (Prentice-Hall, 1994) .
 Charles F. Stevens, The Six Core Theories of Modern Physics, (MIT Press, 1995) .
 Markus Zahn, Electromagnetic Field Theory: a problem solving approach, (John Wiley & Sons, 1979) 

Graduate-level textbooks

 Landau, L. D.,  The Classical Theory of Fields (Course of Theoretical Physics: Volume 2),  (Butterworth-Heinemann: Oxford, 1987). .

 Charles W. Misner, Kip S. Thorne, John Archibald Wheeler, Gravitation, (1970) W.H. Freeman, New York; . (Provides a treatment of Maxwell's equations in terms of differential forms.)Vector calculus
P. C. Matthews Vector Calculus, Springer 1998, 
H. M. Schey, Div Grad Curl and all that:  An informal text on vector calculus'', 4th edition (W. W. Norton & Company, 2005) .

Electrodynamics
Electromagnetic radiation
Electromagnetism
Hyperbolic partial differential equations
Mathematical physics
Equations of physics